One-Two-GO Airlines Co. Ltd was a low-cost airline based in Don Mueang, Bangkok, Thailand. Its main base was Don Mueang International Airport, Bangkok. It was owned and managed by Orient Thai Airlines and CEO Udom Tantiprasongchai and his wife Nina Tantiprasongchai. The One-Two-GO brand was retired in July 2010, after the crash of flight OG 269 in 2007 was blamed substantially on misconduct by the airline, with the aircraft re-branded under Orient Thai Airlines. On October 9, 2018, Orient Thai Airlines ceased all operations.

History 
The airline started operations on 3 December 2003.

Crash of Flight 269 

Following the crash of OG 269 in Phuket, Thailand on September 16, 2007, One-Two-GO was banned from flying in European Union nations due to safety concerns.

On April 8, 2009, the European Commission added One-Two-GO Airlines to its blacklist of airline operators banned from entering European airspace.

Corruption within One-Two-GO Airlines and the Thai Department of Civil Aviation was a factor for the crash investigators of Flight 269.

Australia's Channel 9 broadcast a program in November 2007 which detailed accusations of maintenance fraud and specifically by CEO Udom Tantiprasongchai, coercion and bribery of pilots to fly excessive hours. The program contained an interview with lead Thai investigator Director-General Vuttichai Singhamany as he reviewed the daily flight rosters for One-Two-GO given to him by reporter Ferguson, documenting the Captain and First Officer's schedules showing that both pilots had flown beyond the legal limit for the week and for the month of the crash. Director-General Vuttichai said he would demand an explanation for the fraud from One-Two-GO.

In late February 2008, the victim's families, concerned about the impartiality and transparency of the crash investigation, created a website and on-line petition called InvestigateUdom.com calling for a proper investigation into the root causes of the crash.

The lead Thai Department of Civil Aviation investigator reported that documents he had received from One-Two-GO were fiction. The National Transportation Safety Board (which were also investigating the accident) report included the true work rosters, obtained by the family of a victim. The United States National Transportation Safety Board (NTSB) report documented possible check ride fraud among four other One-Two-GO pilots in the months following the crash.

Three years after the crash, the British government began its inquest process into the deaths of the eight British citizens killed. The inquest, held 22–23 March 2011, was presided over by H.M. Coroner, S.P.G. Fisher. Coroner Fisher relied on a British aviation investigator, the NTSB, and Thai reports, and victim and family statements to make his conclusions. He cited the "flagrant disregard for passenger safety" by the airline and said, "the primary failure so far as I am concerned relates to the corporate culture which prevailed both One-Two-GO Airlines and Orient Thai Airlines prior to and following the air crash." Fisher twice contacted the airline to send a representative to the hearing. The airline replied that they would not take part in the proceedings.

Former destinations 
One-Two-GO Airlines served domestic destinations Chiang Rai and Phuket from their base at Don Mueang International Airport in Bangkok.

Former fleet

The One-Two-GO Airlines fleet consisted of the following aircraft:

5 McDonnell Douglas MD-82 (Operated by Orient Thai Airlines)

The airline was in negotiations to purchase several used MD-80s aircraft for expansion. This never happened.

Incidents and accidents 
On September 16, 2007, One-Two-GO Airlines Flight 269, a McDonnell Douglas MD-82 flying from Bangkok with 123 passengers and seven crew members, crashed in strong winds and heavy rain after attempting to land at Phuket International Airport. The aircraft was mostly destroyed in the blazing inferno that soon developed after the crash as the fuselage tore in two. 89 people were killed. 45 of the dead were tourists. Thai aviation officials initially claimed that weather was a probable factor.  The cause of the crash was later determined to be multiple flight crew errors caused by systemic failures including corruption and lack of training at One-Two-GO and within Thailand's Civil Aviation Authority, Department of Civil Aviation.

References

External links 

Defunct airlines of Thailand
Defunct low-cost airlines
Airlines established in 2003
Airlines disestablished in 2010
Thai companies established in 2003

ja:ワン・トゥー・ゴー航空